Ismael Blas Rolón Silvero S.D.B.  (January 24, 1914 – June 8, 2010) was a Paraguayan prelate of the Roman Catholic Church. At the time of his death, he was one of the oldest Catholic bishops and the oldest bishop from Paraguay.

Rolón Silvero was born in Caazapá, Paraguay in 1914. He was ordained a priest on November 23, 1941, from the religious institute of the Salesians of Don Bosco. He was appointed prelate to the Caacupé Diocese on August 2, 1960. On October 20, 1965, he was appointed Titular Bishop of Furnos Maior and ordained January 23, 1966. Rolón Silvero was appointed bishop of the Caacupé Diocese and then appointed to the Archdiocese of Asunción on June 16, 1970. Rolón retired from the Archdiocese of Asuncion on May 20, 1989.

External links
Catholic-Hierarchy
Diocese site

1914 births
2010 deaths
People from Caazapá
Paraguayan Roman Catholic archbishops
Participants in the Second Vatican Council
20th-century Roman Catholic bishops in Paraguay
Salesian bishops
Roman Catholic bishops of Caacupé
Roman Catholic archbishops of Asunción